The Eastern Eparchy of the Ukrainian Orthodox Church of Canada, an autonomous part of the Church of Constantinople, is currently vacant, with Metropolitan Yurij (Kalistchuk) of Winnipeg serving as the diocese's locum tenens. Prior to his election as primate of the UOCC in 2010 Metropolitan Yurij served as Archbishop of Toronto and the Eastern Eparchy. The UOCC's Eastern Eparchy consists of the Canadian provinces of Ontario and Quebec, and consists of 27 parish cathedrals and churches.

Cathedrals
St. Volodymyr's Ukrainian Orthodox Cathedral (Toronto)
St. Sophie's Ukrainian Orthodox Cathedral (Montreal)

See also
Ukrainian Orthodox Church of Canada
Metropolitan Yurij (Kalistchuk) of Winnipeg

External links
Official Website of the Eastern Eparchy, Ukrainian Orthodox Church of Canada
Ukrainian Orthodox Church of Canada

Ukrainian Orthodox Church of Canada
Toronto and Eastern Canada
Ukrainian
Christianity in Toronto